Oleg Anatolyevich Rydny (born 7 April 1967) is a Russian professional football coach and a former player.

Club career
He made his professional debut in the Soviet Top League in 1988 for FC Shakhtar Donetsk.

References

1967 births
Living people
Soviet footballers
Russian footballers
Russian expatriate footballers
Expatriate footballers in Hungary
Expatriate footballers in Latvia
Russian Premier League players
FC Shakhtar Donetsk players
FC Dynamo Stavropol players
FC Lokomotiv Nizhny Novgorod players
Russian expatriate sportspeople in Latvia
Association football forwards
FC Znamya Truda Orekhovo-Zuyevo players
FC Mashuk-KMV Pyatigorsk players